Tordsnose is a mountain on the border of Fjord Municipality (in Møre og Romsdal county) and Skjåk Municipality (in Innlandet county) in Norway. Other mountains surrounding it include Veltdalseggi to the east and Vulueggi and Krosshø to the south.

See also
List of mountains of Norway

References

Mountains of Møre og Romsdal
Fjord (municipality)
Skjåk
One-thousanders of Norway